Pedro Rafael Barbosa Santos (born 18 January 1996 in Estarreja) is a Portuguese footballer who plays for SC São João de Ver as a defender.

Football career
On 11 August 2013, Santos made his professional debut with Feirense in a 2013–14 Segunda Liga match against Leixões.

References

External links

Stats and profile at LPFP 

1996 births
Living people
Portuguese footballers
Association football defenders
Primeira Liga players
Liga Portugal 2 players
C.D. Feirense players
G.D. Gafanha players
R.D. Águeda players
Anadia F.C. players
SC São João de Ver players
Sportspeople from Aveiro District